Konarak (also Romanized as Konārak and Kenārak; also known as Kūmārak and Kunārak) is a city in and the capital of Konarak County, Sistan and Baluchestan Province, Iran. At the 2006 census, its population was 28,685, in 6,044 families.

It is situated in the western coast of Chabahar Bay, facing Chabahar Port to the East, on the Makran coast on the Gulf of Oman, about 50 km West of the Iran-Pakistan coastal border line.  Like in nearby Pakistan's Balochistan province, the overwhelming majority of the city's inhabitants are ethnic Baloch who speak the Balochi language.

Konarak Airport is a military airbase (see below), which also has civilian flights.

Military Bases

Armed Forces of the Islamic Republic of Iran (army, navy, air force) have established bases in Konarak for a long time — the construction of which started in the 1970s — before the Iranian Revolution, with the support of Western engineering, construction and logistics firms such as Brown & Root.
The Iranian Navy also has a related base in Pasabandar, further East and very close to the border with Pakistan. The support vessel Konarak was named in the city's honour; the Konarak was destroyed in a 2020 accident.

References

Populated places in Konarak County

Cities in Sistan and Baluchestan Province